Cinder Hill is a prominent dissected volcano,  high, consisting of layers of red basalt scoria and cinders and abundant olivine nodules, standing between Harrison Stream and Wilson Stream on the ice-free lower west slopes of Mount Bird, Ross Island. It was mapped and descriptively named by the New Zealand Geological Survey Antarctic Expedition, 1958–59.

References
 

Volcanoes of Ross Island
Cinder cones